The West Bengal Housing Infrastructure Development Corporation or HIDCO is a public sector undertaking headquartered in Narkelbagan, Action Area - I of New Town, Kolkata, West Bengal, India. It plans and executes buildings, projects, parks, museum and other construction activity like subways, overbridges and Monorail from Ultadanga to New Town via Salt Lake in the Indian state of West Bengal. It looks after development projects in New Town, Kolkata, West Bengal and adjacent parts of Rajarhat (Rajarhat-Gopalpur (M) and Rajarhat CD Block) also. HIDCO has prepared the LUDCP and it is developing all infrastructure like roads, drains, sewerage line, water supply lines, major beautification works and other related major works as per master plan. With multinational IT giants are setting up campuses in the area, the civic body wants to make infrastructure full–proof.

Many well known constructions such as the KMOMA, New Town Eco Park, Biswa Bangla Gate, International Finance Hub of Kolkata, Rabindra Tirtha, Nazrul Tirtha, Vocational Training Institute, N–S Corridor, Convention Center etc. are some of the projects developed by HIDCO.

See also
 Bidhannagar, Kolkata
 KMOMA
 Rabindra Tirtha
 New Town Eco Park
 Government of West Bengal

References

External links
 Official homepage

State urban development authorities of India
Companies based in Kolkata
State agencies of West Bengal
Government agencies with year of establishment missing